The Pine River flows along the Minnesota-Ontario border a short distance, primarily within the Boundary Waters Canoe Area Wilderness and La Verendrye Provincial Park. The river is part of the Winnipeg River drainage basin and is a tributary of the Granite River.

From its source at Fortune Lake, the river first flows in a southwest direction through Prelate Lake, Addie Lake, and North Lake before reaching Gunflint Lake. From here, the river then flows north into Magnetic Lake, Clove Lake, and Granite Lake, at which point it joins the Granite River. The Granite River then continues northward along the border into Saganaga Lake.

By portaging around rapids, the Pine River is navigable by canoe.

See also
List of rivers of Ontario
List of rivers of Minnesota

Notes and References

Sources

Rivers of Minnesota
Rivers of Rainy River District
International rivers of North America
Canada–United States border